{{Infobox person
| name        = Gaurav Gera
| image       = Gaurav Gera.jpg
| caption     = Gaurav Gera at unveils Shefali Sharma's music album
| birth_date  = 
| birth_place = Faridabad, Haryana, India
| nationality = 
| occupation  = 
| yearsactive = 2000–present
}}
Gaurav Gera (born 23 September 1973) is an Indian comedian and actor who works in Hindi language films and television series. He also worked in Bollywood musical Jhumroo. He is well known for playing the role of Nandu in Jassi Jaisi Koi Nahin. Gaurav has been granted exclusive Snapchat filters on multiple occasions to meet up with his fans’ demands.

Career
Television
Gera started his career with Life Nahin Hai Laddoo on Star Plus and then he played the supporting role as Nandu in Sony TV's show Jassi Jaisi Koi Nahin. He also appeared in various shows, Kohi Apna Sa, Baat Hamari Pakki Hai, Babban Bhai v/s Bimla Tai. He also played the lead role in Sab TV's show Tota Weds Maina and Colors TV show Mrs. Pammi Pyarelal.Women are following my saris, blouses: Gaurav Gera He was last seen in Colors TV's reality show Comedy Nights with Kapil as Dulari. In 2016, he made a cameo in the series Naagin as Chutki. He was also a participant on Jhalak Dikhhla Jaa. In 2019 he appeared in the Alt Balaji show Boss - Baap of Special Services where he essayed the role of Jignesh.

Films
Gera made his Bollywood debut with the Hindi movie Kyun...! Ho Gaya Na, where he played a cameo role. In 2008, he played Vinay Pathak's younger brother Vivek in Dasvidaniya. He also gave cameo appearances in Chalo Dilli, Woodstock Villa, MP3: Mera Pehla Pehla Pyaar In 2015, he starred in MSG: The Messenger'' as Bhondu.

Other media
Gera is known for a range of characters he essays on his Snapchat and Instagram handles, these include the widely popular Shopkeeper, Chutki, Billi Massi among others.

Television

Films

References

External links 

 
 

Living people
Male actors from Haryana
Indian male comedians
Indian television presenters
Indian male film actors
Indian male soap opera actors
Indian male television actors
21st-century Indian male actors
1973 births